is a professional Japanese baseball player. He plays catcher for the Hiroshima Toyo Carp.

External links

NPB.com

1975 births
Living people
Baseball people from Kyoto Prefecture
Japanese baseball players
Nippon Professional Baseball catchers
Hiroshima Toyo Carp players
Japanese baseball coaches
Nippon Professional Baseball coaches